Panama Refining Co. v. Ryan, 293 U.S. 388 (1935), also known as the Hot Oil case, was a case, in which the United States Supreme Court ruled that the Franklin Roosevelt administration's prohibition of interstate and foreign trade in petroleum goods produced in excess of state quotas, the "hot oil" orders adopted under the 1933 National Industrial Recovery Act (NIRA), was unconstitutional.

The ruling was the first of several that overturned key elements of the administration's New Deal legislative program. The relevant section 9(c) of the NIRA was found to be an unconstitutional delegation of legislative power, as it permitted presidential interdiction of trade without defining criteria for the application of the proposed restriction.

The finding thus differed from later rulings that argued that federal government action affecting intrastate production breached the Commerce Clause of the Constitution; in Panama v. Ryan, the Court found that Congress had violated the nondelegation doctrine by vesting the President with legislative powers without clear guidelines and giving the President enormous and unchecked powers. The omission of congressional guidance on state petroleum production ceilings occasioned the adverse ruling because it allowed the executive to assume the role of the legislature. Justice Cardozo dissented and claimed that the guidelines had been sufficient.

See also
Connally Hot Oil Act of 1935

Further reading

External links

United States Constitution Article One case law
United States Supreme Court cases of the Hughes Court
United States Commerce Clause case law
United States energy case law
1935 in United States case law
United States nondelegation doctrine case law
History of the petroleum industry in the United States
United States Supreme Court cases

Constitutional challenges to the New Deal